James Findlay (October 12, 1770December 28, 1835) was an American merchant, politician and veteran of the War of 1812, having served with both the state militia and the United States Army. He was based in Cincinnati, Ohio after migrating there as a young man. He was elected as mayor of Cincinnati to two non-successive terms.

For defenses in the War of 1812, he supervised construction of Fort Findlay, which was named for him. In 1824. he was elected to multiple terms in the US House of Representatives, serving from 1825-1833.

Early life
Findlay was born in Mercersburg in the Province of Pennsylvania, to Samuel Findlay and Jane Smith. He had two older brothers, John and William. All three brothers became politicians: John Findlay served in the U.S. House of Representatives from Pennsylvania, and William Findlay served two separate periods as governor of Pennsylvania.

Career
fter their father suffered financial setbacks, Findlay moved to the Northwest Territory in 1793 with his wife Jane Irwin (1769–1851). There, in partnership with John Smith, he soon became a leading merchant and influential in the young city of Cincinnati. He was elected to the legislature of the Northwest Territory in 1798. In 1802, he was appointed as the United States Marshal for the Northwest Territory.

In 1800, Findlay was appointed as receiver of public money at the Cincinnati Public Land Office, as settlers arrived in the Northwest Territory seeking land. As such, he was the region's most visible federal official and a central figure in the business and politics of Cincinnati.

After statehood, he was elected in 1804 as mayor of Cincinnati, serving into 1806. He was re-elected in 1810, serving through 1811. Findlay participated in the Ohio state militia, attaining the rank of brigadier general.

In 1806 and 1807, Findlay helped to quash the Burr conspiracy. That required him to confront his partner Smith, an alleged conspirator. In the War of 1812, Findlay was commissioned as a colonel in the United States Army, and commanded the 2nd Ohio Volunteer Infantry. He marched north with General William Hull. He opposed Hull's disastrous decision to surrender Detroit. Afterward Findlay was promoted to major general in the Ohio militia, and built Fort Findlay in 1812, which was named for him. Present-day Findlay, Ohio developed around it.

Findlay was elected in 1824 to represent Ohio's 1st congressional district in the Nineteenth and Twentieth Congresses. He was next elected as a Jacksonian Democrat to the Twenty-first and Twenty-second Congresses, serving in total from March 4, 1825 – March 3, 1833. Findlay eventually broke with the Jackson Democrats.

He was defeated for reelection to the House in 1832. As an Anti-Jacksonian, he lost a bid for Governor of Ohio in 1834.

He died in Cincinnati in 1835 and was buried at Spring Grove Cemetery in Cincinnati.

Legacy
Fort Findlay was named for him, as he had directed its construction.
The Findlay Market, is built on land donated to Cincinnati by the estate of General Findlay and his wife Jane Irwin Findlay.

References

Andrew Cayton. "Findlay, James." American National Biography Online, February 2000.
The Political Graveyard
 Retrieved on 2010-01-01

External links
 
 

1770 births
1835 deaths
19th-century American politicians
American militia generals
Burials at Spring Grove Cemetery
Jacksonian members of the United States House of Representatives from Ohio
Mayors of Cincinnati
Members of the Ohio House of Representatives
Northwest Territory House of Representatives
Ohio National Republicans
People from Mercersburg, Pennsylvania
United States Army colonels
United States Army personnel of the War of 1812
United States Marshals